Stevin Ray Hoover (born October 10, 1948) is an American businessman, writer, philosopher, and former investment manager who wrote a Young Adult/Middle Grade novel entitled THE HANNAH CHRONICLES that was published in 2010.  Prior to becoming a full-time writer, Hoover, in 1989, founded Hoover Capital Management, Inc., a well respected investment management firm where he was CEO from 1989 to 2002.  He also founded and ran the Chestnut Fund LP, a hedge fund.

Hoover was a highly regarded Boston-based investment manager whose reputation as a registered investment advisor was enhanced by the respect of other prominent investment advisors such as Peter Lynch.
Hoover had a very respected and successful 26-year history in the investment business.

Biography

Early years
Stevin Hoover was born in 1948 in Franklin, Pennsylvania, (population 7,300) located in Venango County  in northwestern Pennsylvania.  He lived in Franklin until 1966, when he left for the Millard School, a preparatory school  located in Bandon, Oregon.  The Millard School was a preparatory school for the service academies, in particular the United States Air Force Academy.

Education
Hoover attended Franklin Area High School in Franklin, Pennsylvania, and the Millard School in Bandon, Oregon, which prepared him for entering the United States Air Force Academy, where he was a cadet from 1967 to 1969.  He graduated from the University of Texas at Austin, where he received his BA in 1972 with concentrations in the classics and philosophy. Between 1973 and 1975, he studied German philosophy and language at the Universitaet Hamburg.  He attended Boston University School of Management, where he received his MBA in 1990.

Career and family
Hoover practiced an investment approach best described as "concentrated value."

In 1998, Hoover married a Mississippi native and they have one daughter, Hannah Kathleen HOOVER, who was born on December 2, 1999.

Before launching Hoover Capital Management in 1989, Hoover spent four years as a stockbroker in Germany, where he was a registered representative in the Hamburg, Germany, office of United States stock brokerage company Bache & Co., known in Germany as Bache Halsey Stuart Shields Model & Roland GmbH.  This was followed by 11 years as a registered representative in Bache's Boston office.  Bache & Co was acquired by Prudential Financial in 1981 and became known as Prudential Bache Securities, Inc., later renamed simply Prudential Securities, Inc.  Wachovia acquired Prudential Securities, Inc., in 2003.

Hoover hired John Christopher ("Chris") Wade in HCM's Kansas City, Missouri, office to provide support services, especially portfolio management software support.  Wade had previously been employed by Advent Software Inc. of San Francisco, California, and claimed knowledge of the Advent Portfolio Management systems.  As such, Wade was tasked with maintaining portfolio performance and related data at Hoover Capital.

In September 2001, Wade questioned whether Hoover might have been making transfers between entities controlled by Hoover and unrelated outside third parties that were possibly not authorized.  Taking documents that might have supported his tenuous case, Wade resigned and became a self-styled whistleblower.  Attorneys representing Hoover and HCM defended the case and vigorously denied any wrongdoing, and Wade was viewed as a disgruntled "snitch" who was hoping to help manufacture a case for a whistleblower reward.

The legal case against Hoover, HCM, and Chestnut Fund LP remains the subject of ongoing debate, with many believing the case never should have been brought, as there were no clear improprieties.  One analysis of Hoover's activities was made in 2004 by the U.S. Securities and Exchange Commission while attempting to enact certain regulatory changes to rules governing private investment vehicles.

Current activities 
Between May 2008 and May 2010, Hoover divided his time between Ponte Vedra Beach , Florida, Mobile, Alabama, and Mississippi. Ponte Vedra Beach is best known as being the location of the Players Golf Championship at Sawgrass , the annual U.S. golf tournament with the largest purse on the Professional Golfers Association tour.  In October 2007 Hoover began regular postings to a blog in his name , and the blog was active as of the summer of 2012.  He practices Bikram Hot Yoga.

References

External links
 Stevin Hoover blog
 Bikram Yoga main website 

1948 births
Living people
American businesspeople